Deh Now-e Azizabad (also Romanized as Deh Now-e ‘Azīzābād; also known as ‘Azīzābād and ‘Azīzābād-e Pā’īn) is a village in Azizabad Rural District, in the Central District of Narmashir County, Kerman Province, Iran. At the 2006 census, its population was 1,926, in 440 families.

References 

Populated places in Narmashir County